You're a Winner, Baby is the thirteenth studio album by American singer and drag queen RuPaul, released on January 10, 2020. The album features eight new songs. The album was released on the same day as the Netflix original television series AJ and the Queen, starring RuPaul.

Singles 
On May 30th, 2020, coinciding with the finale of season 12 of RuPaul's Drag Race, "Bring Back My Girls" was released as the first single alongside the standalone single "The Shady Bunch" featuring the cast of season 12. "Bring Back My Girls" was also used as a lipsync between the top 3 in the finale of season 12. "Bring Back My Girls" is also used as the runway theme for season 13 of RuPaul's Drag Race.

On January 9, 2021 "Condragulations" was released as the second single featuring 7 members of the cast of RuPaul's Drag Race season 13, Elliott with 2 Ts, Gottmik, Kandy Muse, LaLa Ri, Olivia Lux, Symone, and Tina Burner.

Track listing

See also
List of 2020 albums

References

RuPaul albums
2020 albums